Sarticus is a genus of beetles in the family Carabidae, containing the following species:

 Sarticus aubei (Castelnau, 1867)
 Sarticus blackburni (Sloane, 1895)
 Sarticus brevicornis Blackburn, 1892
 Sarticus civilis (Germar, 1848)
 Sarticus cooki Sloane, 1903
 Sarticus coradgeri Sloane, 1903
 Sarticus cyaneocinctus (Chaudoir, 1865)
 Sarticus cycloderus (Chaudoir, 1865)
 Sarticus dampieri Sloane, 1903
 Sarticus discopunctatus (Chaudoir, 1865)
 Sarticus dixoni Sloane, 1915
 Sarticus esmeraldipennis (Castelnau, 1867)
 Sarticus freyi Straneo, 1960
 Sarticus habitans Sloane, 1889
 Sarticus impar Sloane, 1903
 Sarticus iriditinctus (Chaudoir, 1865)
 Sarticus ischnus (Chaudoir, 1878)
 Sarticus macleayi Sloane, 1889
 Sarticus monarensis Sloane, 1889
 Sarticus obesulus (Chaudoir, 1865)
 Sarticus obscurus Blackburn, 1892
 Sarticus obsolescens Moore, 1963
 Sarticus rockhamptoniensis (Castelnau, 1867)
 Sarticus sulcatus (W.J.Macleay, 1878)

References

Pterostichinae